Brocton may refer to:

Places
United Kingdom
 Brocton, Cornwall
 Brocton, Staffordshire

United States
 Brocton, Illinois
 Brocton, New York

Other
 Brocton F.C., in Brocton, Staffordshire

See also
Brockton (disambiguation)